Adam Daniel Greenberg (born February 21, 1981) is an American former professional baseball player. He was an outfielder for the Chicago Cubs of Major League Baseball in 2005 and was best known for being hit in the head in his major league debut on the first pitch of his first plate appearance. He suffered a compound skull fracture from the pitch.

Greenberg was one of two players in league history to be hit by a pitch in their only plate appearance without ever taking the field. However, a successful online petition drive in 2012 led to him getting signed by the Miami Marlins to a one-day contract. He had one at bat for the Marlins and struck out on three pitches. He agreed to a minor league contract with the Baltimore Orioles for 2013, but the option wasn't pursued.

He also played parts of five seasons with the Bridgeport Bluefish of the Atlantic League of Professional Baseball near his hometown.

Early life and high school
Greenberg is the son of Wendy and Mark Greenberg. He is Jewish. He attended Guilford High School in Guilford, Connecticut and was a four-year letterman on Guilford's baseball, basketball, and soccer teams.

Greenberg was baseball team captain as a junior and senior, four-time All-conference and all-area, and was the first player in Connecticut history to be named to four all-state teams.

Greenberg also served as soccer team captain for 1998 and 1999, and was a striker and four-year starter. Greenberg was a three-time all-conference, all-area, and all-state selection. He was named all-New England and All-America in 1998, during which season he set the school season record with 17 assists. Greenberg was also the team and area most valuable player in 1998, and helped lead Guilford to the state soccer title in 1996. Greenberg holds the school record for career assists, with 33.

College and draft
Greenberg went to college at the University of North Carolina at Chapel Hill. There, he played college baseball for the North Carolina Tar Heels in the Atlantic Coast Conference (ACC). After the 2001 season, he played collegiate summer baseball with the Chatham A's of the Cape Cod Baseball League.

As a junior in 2002, he hit .337, stole 35 bases, scored 80 runs, homered 17 times, and again led the ACC with seven triples. He was named to the All-Conference Team.  In 2002, he was named a Jewish Sports Review College Baseball First Team All-American.

He was selected by the Chicago Cubs in the ninth round of the 2002 Major League Baseball Draft.

Minor leagues (2002–2005)
In 2002, Greenberg hit .224 for the Lansing Lugnuts, and .384/.500/.575 in 21 games for the Daytona Cubs, swiping 15 bases in 17 tries.

Greenberg spent the 2003 season with Daytona and put up a .299/.387/.410 line, stealing 26 bases in 35 attempts. In 2003, when Executive Editor of Baseball America Jim Callis was asked whether he thought Greenberg had a chance to be a starter, or was destined to be a backup, he responded:  "Very good character guy, often compared to John Cangelosi, more of a fourth or fifth outfielder."

In 2004, Greenberg hit .291 with a .381 OBP for Daytona, with 12 triples in 91 games (tying for the Florida State League lead), and moved up to the West Tenn Diamond Jaxx, where he put up a .274 batting average in 33 games. His season ended with the Iowa Cubs. Overall, his 14 triples tied him for third in the minor leagues.
Greenberg began 2005 with West Tennessee, hitting .269 with a .386 on-base percentage with nine triples and 15 steals.  He spent three months of the winter playing baseball in Venezuela, playing center field and leading off.

Chicago Cubs (2005)

On July 7, 2005, Greenberg was called up to the Cubs' major league team from their West Tennessee Double-A affiliate. Pinch hitting in the ninth inning against the Florida Marlins, in a game on July 9, Greenberg was hit directly in the back of his head by a 92 mph fastball on the very first pitch from Valerio de los Santos. Greenberg suffered a concussion as a result of the beaning, and was immediately removed from the game and taken to a hospital. Carlos Zambrano was sent in to pinch-run for Greenberg, and eventually came around to score the Cubs' fifth run in an 8–2 victory.

De los Santos called to check on him and apologize. As a result of the injury, Greenberg couldn’t sleep upright, or even bend down to tie his shoes without losing his balance. He spent the rest of the 2005 season on the 15-day disabled list, and continued to suffer from positional vertigo, terrible headaches, nausea, double vision and dizziness.

Return to minors, Independent League (2006–2011)
In 2006, Greenberg hit .179 for the Diamond Jaxx and .118 for Iowa, and was released by the Chicago Cubs organization on June 2, 2006. Mike Downey of the Chicago Tribune, in an interview on 06/06/06, compared him to Moonlight Graham, who 100 years earlier had appeared in his only Major League game, only to not get an official at-bat, a story recounted in the film Field of Dreams. Greenberg said in the interview, "If that was the extent of my time as a baseball player, just that one very strange little moment, well, there's nothing more I can do about it."

Signed by the Los Angeles Dodgers a few days later, Greenberg was assigned to the Jacksonville Suns, hitting .228, but had a .387 on-base percentage (his minor league average), as he had more walks than hits. He also hit well against lefties, with a .455 batting average, and hit .313 with runners on base. Following this stint in the Dodgers' farm system, Greenberg played for the Kansas City Royals organization. The Kansas City Royals agreed to terms with Greenberg on a minor-league contract on December 5, 2006.

Greenberg played the 2007 season with the Royals' Double-A Wichita Wranglers in the Texas League. He batted .266 with a .373 on-base percentage (10th in the league), a league-leading 11 triples, 13 sacrifice hits (second in the league), 74 walks (tied for fourth in the league), and 23 stolen bases (fifth in the league) in 467 at bats, while leading the team with 73 runs scored.

In December 2007, the Royals signed Greenberg to a minor league contract for 2008.  Unable to gain a spot in the Triple-A Omaha Royals outfield, Greenberg was granted free agency by Kansas City.  After a brief stint with the Independent Bridgeport Bluefish near his hometown of Guilford, in which he batted .289 with a .450 on-base percentage, Greenberg signed a contract with the Los Angeles Angels of Anaheim and was assigned to the Double-A Arkansas Travelers.  There, he batted .271 with a .361 on-base percentage, and 16 steals in 262 at-bats.

On February 23, 2009, Greenberg signed a minor league contract with the Cincinnati Reds and was invited to minor league spring training.

He did not make the team in spring training, and played with the Independent League Bridgeport Bluefish.  In an August 8, 2009, game, Jim Heuser's first pitch sailed behind Greenberg, who yelled out to Heuser.  Greenberg was then drilled by a 2–2 pitch and went to charge the mound, but pulled back.  Both benches cleared and there was a shove or two in the middle of the pack.  He had 53 steals, the team's single season record.

Greenberg finished the 2010 season with the Bluefish batting .258 in 105 games, with a team-high 75 walks.

He played outfield for the Bluefish again in 2011, his fourth year with the team.  He faced De Los Santos, who was pitching for the Long Island Ducks, the same pitcher who had hit him in the head in his sole Major League at bat, and this time he singled.  Greenberg said:  It was a big deal. As much as I might try to pretend it wasn't. It's been five and a half years, and to face him again in a game that meant something and get the result, to get a hit off him, it was a special moment. ... You have the what-if stuff, 'what if he threw that first pitch for a strike five and a half years ago?' Greenberg later went hitless in his seven remaining at bats against De Los Santos throughout the course of the season.  He led the Bluefish in several categories in the 2011 season, including triples, walks and stolen bases.

Miami Marlins (2012)
In 2012, a Chicago Cubs fan started an online petition to get Greenberg another Major League plate appearance. The campaign succeeded when the Miami Marlins offered Greenberg a one-day contract to play in their October 2, 2012, home game against the New York Mets. The contract was worth $2,623, which will be donated to an organization that researches brain trauma in athletes. Prior to the game, Marlins manager Ozzie Guillén considered making Greenberg the leadoff hitter and starting him in left field, but then decided he would try to have him bat in the middle of the game and was not sure if he would allow him to run the bases.

Greenberg led off the bottom of the sixth inning as a pinch hitter. The Aerosmith song "Dream On" was played through the stadium's public address system as Greenberg walked to home plate and the crowd gave him a standing ovation. He was struck out by Mets knuckleballer and eventual Cy Young Award winner R. A. Dickey on three pitches and was removed from the lineup at the end of the inning. Greenberg said after the game, "It was magical. The energy that was in the stadium was something that I have never experienced in my life, and I don't know if I'll ever experience that again." He also said he wanted to continue his Major League career and hoped he would be invited to a team's spring training in 2013, ideally the Marlins.

Topps made a Greenberg baseball card for their 2013 series.

Team Israel
Greenberg played for the Israeli national baseball team during the 2013 World Baseball Classic qualifier. Greenberg entered the first game of the tournament as a defensive replacement for left field, and walked during his sole plate appearance. During the second game, Greenberg once again entered as a defensive replacement in left field, and did not have an at bat. Greenberg did not appear in the third and final game.

Retirement
Greenberg officially announced his retirement from baseball in February 2014.

National Jewish Sports Hall of Fame
In 2014, he was inducted into the National Jewish Sports Hall of Fame.

Politics
In April, 2018, Greenberg announced his candidacy for Connecticut's 12th Senate district as a Republican. Ted Kennedy Jr., son of former U.S. Senator Ted Kennedy, announced that he would not run for another term. He lost to Democrat Christine Cohen.

See also

 List of select Jewish Major League Baseball players

References

External links

 MiLB bio

1981 births
Living people
Arkansas Travelers players
Baseball players from New Haven, Connecticut
Bridgeport Bluefish players
Chatham Anglers players
Chicago Cubs players
Daytona Cubs players
Iowa Cubs players
Jacksonville Suns players
Jewish American baseball players
Jewish Major League Baseball players
Lansing Lugnuts players
Miami Marlins players
West Tennessee Diamond Jaxx players
Wichita Wranglers players
21st-century American Jews